Na Bon railway station is a railway station located in Na Bon Subdistrict, Na Bon District, Nakhon Si Thammarat.

Train services 
 Express No. 85/86 Bangkok-Nakhon Si Thammarat-Bangkok
 Rapid No. 167/168 Bangkok-Kantang-Bangkok
 Rapid No. 169/170 Bangkok-Yala-Bangkok
 Rapid No. 173/174 Bangkok-Nakhon Si Thammarat-Bangkok
 Local No. 445/446 Chumphon-Hat Yai Junction-Chumphon
 Local No. 447/448 Surat Thani-Sungai Kolok-Surat Thani

References 
 
 

Railway stations in Thailand